Whale watching in New Zealand is predominantly centered around the areas of Kaikōura and the Hauraki Gulf. Known as the 'whale capital', Kaikōura is a world-famous whale watching site, in particular for sperm whales which is currently the most abundant of large whales in New Zealand waters. The Hauraki Gulf Marine Park (just outside Auckland city) is also a significant whale watching area with a resident population of Bryde's Whales commonly viewed alongside other cetaceans Common Dolphins, Bottlenose Dolphins and Orca.  Whale watching is also offered in other locations, often as eco-tours and in conjunction with dolphin watching. Land-based whale watching from New Zealand's last whaling station, which closed in 1964, is undertaken for scientific purposes, mostly by ex-whalers. Some compilations of sighting footages are available on YouTube.

Background
Many places that were formerly whaling stations went into recession after the collapse of the whaling industry; New Zealand stopped whaling in 1964. Whaling did not stop due to environmental or ethical concerns but because the declining number of whales made the industry uneconomic. Whilst New Zealand protected right whales in 1935, it was not until 1978 that all marine mammals were protected by law. Kaikōura's recent development has been used to advocate the benefits of whale watching over whale hunting and other whale-watching operators such as Auckland Whale & Dolphin Safari have successfully combined scientific research and conservation efforts alongside their commercial offering.  Due to illegal whaling by Soviet Union (with help of Japan) in the 1970s, recovery state of baleen whales migrating to New Zealand coasts were heavily slowed down, far worse than in Australian waters, and this contributed to make public images that Kaikōura is the only site for whale watching, and Sperm Whale is the only species can be observed normally. New Zealand is the first nation in the world to protect marine mammals by law.

Hauraki Gulf
Largely regarded as one of the most abundant and diverse marine reserves in the world, the Hauraki Gulf is home to several species of cetaceans, most notably Bryde's whales, Killer whales (Orca), Common Dolphins and Bottlenose Dolphins.  Situated just off the coast of New Zealand's largest city Auckland, the main whale watching operator Auckland Whale & Dolphin Safari departs from the Viaduct Harbour and runs daily trips (weather permitting) into the Hauraki Gulf Marine Park.

Kaikōura
The sea around Kaikōura supports an abundance of sea life, with the town's income stemming largely from the tourism generated from whale watching and swimming with or around dolphins. Recently the sperm whale watching at Kaikōura has developed rapidly and now it is an industry leader; arguably the most developed in the world.

The dominant organisation in Kaikōura's whale watching industry is Whale Watch Kaikōura, which is run as a charitable organisation. It takes around 100,000 visitors out by boat per annum, and has an annual turnover of NZ$10m. Whale Watch Kaikōura began operating in 1987 with a  boat. Whale watching is also done by air, and the Kaikoura Aerodrome is mainly used for whale spotting tourist flights by Wings over Whales and Air Kaikoura – Kaikoura Aero Club.

Tory Channel
New Zealand's last whaling station was in Whekenui Bay in Tory Channel in the Marlborough Sounds. The high cliffs at the entrance of Tory Channel are ideal for land-based whale watching. During the migratory season for whales, the lookout is manned and whales passing Cook Strait are watched for research purposes. Most of the volunteers undertaking the work are ex-whalers. It is also the location where the first Southern right whale on main islands sighted since the end of whaling. Cetaceans can be seen in Waikawa, Picton, French Pass, and in Abel Tasman National Park as well.

Other locations

Whale watching, in conjunction with dolphin watching, is already offered in the Bay of Islands and Moutohora Island (also known as Whale Island) in the Bay of Plenty.

Future developments
Other locations (or anywhere else) in the nation, such as at bays on Aupouri Peninsula, Rangaunu Harbour, Whangarei Harbour, Firth of Thames, Tamaki Bight, eastern Coromandel Peninsula, Mount Maunganui, Hawke's Bay, Castlepoint, vicinity to Wellington, South Taranaki Bight, New Plymouth, Kapiti Island, Golden Bay, Hokitika, Banks Peninsula, Moeraki and Karitane, Otago Peninsula, Taieri Mouth, Nugget Point, The Catlins, Port Craig in Te Waewae Bay, Fiordland, Paterson Inlet, Chatham and Kermadec Islands may possibly become watching locations in the future when numbers of whales migrating into coastal waters show recovery. Sighting numbers of Southern rights, Humpbacks, Blues are showing strong increases in recent years.

Southern right whales, Tohora, 'the most important whale to New Zealand' is very slowly, but steadily making come backs to the nation's waters, and they will possibly become one of the most important species for whale watching as well since they are renowned as a target for non-harmful, land-based watching, and will recolonize the shores of the entire New Zealand to become seasonal residents. (see also Whale Rider, and "real whale riders" sometimes appear for this species). For Southern blue and Pygmy blues, even before the historic discovery of a forging ground off Cape Egmont, whales have been showing come backs along the coasts especially in Northland waters such as off Bay of Islands, Tutukaka, and Kaikōura. Fin whales and Sei whales are confirmed in Chatham Rise in good numbers, but less frequently seen in coastal waters. Minke whales can be seen off entire nation especially in Bay of Islands, but due to their small size it is not easy to observe them. Beaked whales are occasionally seen. Of these, most frequently observed species are Arnoux's beaked whales (once a group of these had become a regular annual to Doubtful Sound), and Gray's beaked whales. New Zealand's coasts are also renowned as prominent habitats for curious, ray-hunting Orcas.

The deep sea canyon off Dunedin was revealed to be a rich habitat for toothed whales and its significance may be comparable to that of Kaikōura especially for the presences of Shepherd's beaked whales.

See also

Whale watching in Australia
Whale watching in Ireland

References

Tourist attractions in New Zealand
New Zealand
Kaikōura
Articles containing video clips